Alfred Schrottenbaum (12 April 1938 – 25 December 2004) was an Austrian footballer. He played in one match for the Austria national football team in 1963.

References

External links
 

1938 births
2004 deaths
Austrian footballers
Austria international footballers
Place of birth missing
Association footballers not categorized by position